Dorrington is a census-designated place (CDP) in Calaveras County, California, United States. The population was 609 at the 2010 census, down from 727 at the 2000 census. Originally known as Cold Spring Ranch until 1902 (because of an icy spring), the town sits on State Route 4 and historically was a stopping point along the toll road between Murphys and Ebbetts Pass, often serving as a resort for visitors to what is now Calaveras Big Trees State Park. Dorrington is also home to the second largest Sugar Pine in the world, measuring 32 feet (9.7 m) in circumference and 220 feet (67 m) tall.
Dorrington is named for Dora Connell (Meyers), wife of John (Jack) Connell of Camp Connell.

Geography
The elevation is 4,308 feet.

History
Originally known as Cold Springs Ranch, the town's name changed upon establishment of the post office in 1902. The name Dorrington comes from Dora Connell (Meyers) wife of John (Jack) Connell Postmaster. The post office was discontinued in 1919, but re-established in 1921 and closed for good in 1934.

Demographics

At the 2010 census Dorrington had a population of 609. The racial makeup of Dorrington was 576 (94.6%) White, 0 (0.0%) African American, 2 (0.3%) Native American, 11 (1.8%) Asian, 1 (0.2%) Pacific Islander, 1 (0.2%) from other races, and 18 (3.0%) from two or more races. Hispanic or Latino of any race were 33 people (5.4%).

The whole population lived in households, no one lived in non-institutionalized group quarters and no one was institutionalized.

There were 294 households, 44 (15.0%) had children under the age of 18 living in them, 174 (59.2%) were opposite-sex married couples living together, 14 (4.8%) had a female householder with no husband present, 3 (1.0%) had a male householder with no wife present.  There were 16 (5.4%) unmarried opposite-sex partnerships, and 3 (1.0%) same-sex married couples or partnerships. 86 households (29.3%) were one person and 30 (10.2%) had someone living alone who was 65 or older. The average household size was 2.07.  There were 191 families (65.0% of households); the average family size was 2.50.

The age distribution was 76 people (12.5%) under the age of 18, 19 people (3.1%) aged 18 to 24, 58 people (9.5%) aged 25 to 44, 277 people (45.5%) aged 45 to 64, and 179 people (29.4%) who were 65 or older.  The median age was 57.6 years. For every 100 females, there were 112.2 males.  For every 100 females age 18 and over, there were 114.9 males.

There were 1,689 housing units at an average density of ,of which 294 were occupied, 269 (91.5%) by the owners and 25 (8.5%) by renters.  The homeowner vacancy rate was 6.2%; the rental vacancy rate was 17.1%.  553 people (90.8% of the population) lived in owner-occupied housing units and 56 people (9.2%) lived in rental housing units.

Politics 

References

External links

Census-designated places in Calaveras County, California
Census-designated places in California